Pär Arvidsson (born 27 February 1960 in Finspång) is a former butterfly swimmer from Sweden. He won the 100 m butterfly at the 1980 Summer Olympics in Moscow, after having set the world record in the same event a couple of months earlier in Austin, Texas.  He held the record until April 1981.

Between 1976 and 1983 he became Swedish champion 22 times.

He held the Swedish record in the 200 butterfly until 2008.

After graduating from the University of California, Berkeley with a degree in economics he attended and graduated from Harvard Business School.

Personal bests

Long course (50 m)

Clubs
Finspångs SK

References

1960 births
Swedish male butterfly swimmers
Swimmers at the 1976 Summer Olympics
Swimmers at the 1980 Summer Olympics
Olympic swimmers of Sweden
Living people
Olympic gold medalists for Sweden
World record setters in swimming
World Aquatics Championships medalists in swimming
European Aquatics Championships medalists in swimming
Harvard Business School alumni
Swedish expatriates in the United States
Medalists at the 1980 Summer Olympics
Olympic gold medalists in swimming
UC Berkeley College of Letters and Science alumni